Monument Hill in the Beezley Hills is the second highest summit in Grant County, Washington at  or .  Monument Hill Road runs nearly to the summit, and another road runs a few hundred meters to the antenna farm at the summit itself.

The antenna farm at the summit includes the KWWW-FM transmitter and KZML transmitter.

References

Further reading

Mountains of Grant County, Washington
Mountains of Washington (state)